Jean-Bernard Duvivier (Bruges, 1762 – Paris, 1837) was a painter and drawer of portraits and historical and religious subjects, a book illustrator and a professor at the Normal School in Paris. After having been instructed by Hubert  and Paul de Cock and Suvée, he studied in Italy for six years. His style is characterised by balanced composition, lifelike drawing and bright colours.

Paintings
 Horatius kills his Sister Camilla, 1785, Le Mans, Musée de Tessé
 Cleopatra Captured by Roman Soldiers after the Death of Mark Antony, 1789, Rochester, Memorial Art Gallery of the University of Rochester
 Portrait of the Family Villers, 1790, Bruges, Groeningemuseum
 Portrait of a Noble Woman, 1806,  Brooklyn Museum
 Scene of Deluge, Besançon, Musée des Beaux-Arts et d'Archéologie

Drawings
 The Funeral of Hector, 1793, Brussels, Royal Museum of Fine Arts of Belgium
 Portrait of François Maine de Biran, 1798, location unknown
 Troyan Soldier, 1800-1801, Orléans, Musée des Beaux-Arts

Notes

References
 Donald. A. Rosenthal, A Cleopatra by Bernard Duvivier, in: Porticus. The Journal of the Memorial Art Gallery of the University of Rochester 8 (1985), p. 13-25.
 Dominique Marechal, J. Bernard Duvivier (1762–1837), un peintre dessinateur néo-classique brugeois à Paris, in: Jaarboek 1995-1997. Stad Brugge. Stedelijke Musea, Bruges, 1997, p. 216-237 and 337-47.
Le romantisme en Belgique, exhibition catalogue, Brussels, Royal Museums of Fine Arts of Belgium, 2005, cat. 24.
Bruges Paris Rome. Joseph Benoît Suvée et le néoclassicisme, exhibition catalogue, Bruges, 2007.
 Dominique Marechal, Jean-Bernard Duvivier, bibliophile. Concerning Karel van Hulthem, the adventures of Robinson Crusoe and the death of Marat, in: Hommage Robert Hozee. Museum voor Schone Kunsten Gent 1982-2012, Ghent, 2014, p. 215-216, and 240; ill. p. 98
 https://londonartweek.co.uk/artworks/head-of-a-bearded-man/?cookie-state-change=1666101777747
Attribution:
 

1762 births
1837 deaths
Artists from Bruges
18th-century Flemish painters
19th-century Flemish painters
19th-century French painters